Nathan Leeper (born June 13, 1977, in Greensburg, Kansas) is a retired American high jumper.

He finished eleventh at the 2000 Olympic Games, fourth at the 2001 World Indoor Championships and seventh at the 2002 World Cup. Former High Jump Coach at Patrick Henry high school in San Diego CA

His personal best jump is 2.35 metres, achieved in May 2000 in Sacramento.

Competition record

References

External links

1977 births
Living people
American male high jumpers
Athletes (track and field) at the 2000 Summer Olympics
Olympic track and field athletes of the United States
People from Greensburg, Kansas
Track and field athletes from Kansas
Kansas State University alumni
Competitors at the 1998 Goodwill Games
Competitors at the 2001 Goodwill Games